Marat Serikuly Shakhmetov (born 6 February 1989) is a Kazakhstani professional footballer who plays for FC Taraz in the Kazakhstan Premier League.

Career
The defensive midfielder previously played for FC Tsesna.

In July 2014, Shakhmetov moved to FC Atyrau on loan, with Guy Essame going the other way.

Shakhter Karagandy
On 21 November 2018, Shakhmetov signed a new two-year contract with Shakhter Karagandy, keeping him at the club until the end of the 2020 season.

Career Stats

Club

International

Statistics accurate as of match played 4 June 2013

References

External links 

Living people
1989 births
Kazakhstani footballers
Kazakhstan international footballers
Kazakhstan under-21 international footballers
Kazakhstan Premier League players
FC Astana players
FC Zhetysu players
FC Atyrau players
FC Taraz players
FC Akzhayik players
FC Shakhter Karagandy players
FC Caspiy players
Association football midfielders